Dirphia is a genus of moths in the family Saturniidae first described by Jacob Hübner in 1819.

Species
The genus includes the following species:

Dirphia abhorca Lemaire, 1969
Dirphia acidalia Hübner, 1819
Dirphia aculea Vuillot, 1892
Dirphia albescens Brechlin & Meister, 2008
Dirphia araucariae E.D. Jones, 1908
Dirphia avia (Stoll, 1780)
Dirphia avrilae Lemaire, 1980
Dirphia barinasensis Meister & Wenczel, 2002
Dirphia baroma (Schaus, 1906)
Dirphia brevifurca Strand, 1911
Dirphia cadioui Lemaire, 1980
Dirphia carimaguensis Decaens, Bonilla & Naumann, 2005
Dirphia centralis F. Johnson & Michener, 1948
Dirphia centrifurca Naumann, Brosch & Wenczel, 2005
Dirphia crassifurca Lemaire, 1971
Dirphia curitiba Draudt, 1930
Dirphia demarmelsi Naumann, Brosch, Wenczel & Clavijo, 2005
Dirphia dentimaculata (Schaus, 1921)
Dirphia diasi (Lemaire, 1994)
Dirphia docquinae Lemaire, 1993
Dirphia dolosa Bouvier, 1929
Dirphia fernandezi Lemaire, 1972
Dirphia fornax (Druce, 1903)
Dirphia fraterna (R. Felder & Rogenhofer, 1874)
Dirphia horca Dognin, 1894
Dirphia horcana Schaus, 1911
Dirphia inexpectata L. & T. Racheli, 2005
Dirphia irradians Lemaire, 1972
Dirphia lemoulti Bouvier, 1930
Dirphia lichyi Lemaire, 1971
Dirphia ludmillae Lemaire, 1974
Dirphia mielkeorum Naumann, Meister & Brosch, 2005
Dirphia moderata Bouvier, 1929
Dirphia monticola Zerny, 1924
Dirphia muscosa Schaus, 1898
Dirphia napoensis L. & T. Racheli, 2005
Dirphia panamensis (Schaus, 1921)
Dirphia proserpina Lemaire, 1982
Dirphia radiata Dognin, 1916
Dirphia rubricauda Bouvier, 1929
Dirphia rufescens F. Johnson & Michener, 1948
Dirphia sombrero Le Cerf, 1934
Dirphia somniculosa (Cramer, 1777)
Dirphia subhorca Dognin, 1901
Dirphia tarquinia (Cramer, 1775)
Dirphia thliptophana (R. Felder & Rogenhofer, 1874)
Dirphia ursina Walker, 1855

References

Hemileucinae